The Battle of Bovillae was a term that Cicero used to describe a fight between the gangs of Clodius and Milo on January 18, 52 BC.  The two were bitter political rivals—Clodius was a candidate for the praetorship and Milo the consulship.  They met by accident on the road near Bovillae, both being accompanied by armed supporters.  In the fighting that ensued, Clodius was killed, setting off a storm of violence in Rome.

References

Bovillae
52 BC
1st century BC in the Roman Republic
Bovillae